Cwichelm is a masculine English given name. Notable people with the name include:

 Cwichelm of Wessex (died 636), Prince of Wessex
 Cwichhelm (bishop) (died after 678), Bishop of Rochester

English masculine given names